Kevin Bailie (born January 3, 1992) is a former Canadian ice hockey player and current corporate lawyer. He played hockey for the Oshawa Generals and London Knights in the Ontario Hockey League prior to attending Queen's University. During both his undergraduate and graduate studies he continued playing for the Gaels at Queen's University and had brief tryouts with the Ottawa Senators and Montreal Canadiens in the National Hockey League before ultimately retiring in favour of a career in law.

Post-sports life
Bailie is a lawyer with the Canadian business law firm Stikeman Elliott, specializing in private equity and mergers and acquisitions.

Playing career

Major junior
Bailie was drafted in the first round, 16th overall by the Oshawa Generals in the 2008 OHL Draft.

Notable moments in Bailie's OHL career include playing alongside Toronto Maple Leaf superstar John Tavares, helping propel the London Knights to a 24-game winning streak, and winning a record setting 19-round shootout against the Mississauga Steelheads.

Collegiate
During his time at Queen's University Bailie was distinguished several times for both academic and athletic achievements, leading him to be described as "a true professional in every sense of the word".

In 2015 Bailie was named the 30th recipient of the Robinson-Kelleher Memorial Award which is presented by the City of Belleville annually to the individual selected as its athlete of the year. Past winners include other local hockey players Andrew Raycroft and Andrew Shaw.

Career statistics

Tournament

International

Awards and honours

References

External links

 Eliteprospects.com, or The Internet Hockey Database, or Queen's University

Living people
1992 births
Sportspeople from Belleville, Ontario
Oshawa Generals players
London Knights players
Queen's Golden Gaels players
21st-century Canadian lawyers
Canadian ice hockey goaltenders
Competitors at the 2017 Winter Universiade
Universiade bronze medalists for Canada
Universiade medalists in ice hockey